is a passenger railway station  located in the city of  Nishinomiya Hyōgo Prefecture, Japan. It is operated by the private transportation company Hankyu Railway. It is located near Kwansei Gakuin University and highschools so many students use this station.

Lines

Layout
The station consists of two opposed ground-level side platforms connected by an elevated station building. The effective length of the platform is 6 cars for Track 1 and 8 cars for Track 2.

Platforms

Adjacent stations

History
Kōtōen Station opened on June 1, 1922.

Passenger statistics
In fiscal 2019, the station was used by an average of 26,007 passengers daily

Surrounding area
Kwansei Gakuin University 
Kwansei Gakuin Junior High School
Kwansei Galuin Senior High School
Hōtoku Gakuen High School
Nigawa Gakuin

See also
List of railway stations in Japan

References

External links

Kōtōen Station (Hankyu Railway) 

Railway stations in Hyōgo Prefecture
Hankyu Railway Imazu Line
Stations of Hankyu Railway
Railway stations in Japan opened in 1922
Nishinomiya